Abby & Brittany is an American reality show on TLC starring 22-year-old conjoined twins Abby and Brittany Hensel that premiered on August 28, 2012. The show features their graduation from Bethel University in Minnesota, subsequent job search, their travels in Europe and their preparations to move to a new house and begin teaching jobs. It was broadcast on BBC Three in the UK in April and May 2013, as three 60-minute episodes.

Episodes

References

External links
 

2010s American reality television series
2012 American television series debuts
2012 American television series endings
English-language television shows
Television shows filmed in Minnesota
TLC (TV network) original programming